The National Association of State Election Directors (NASED) is a U.S. association that was formed in 1989 when a group of state election directors and administrators met in Reno, Nevada. The driving issue at that time that spurred the group to organize was the concern that national networks were releasing presidential election results before all polls had closed.

"The recently enacted Help America Vote Act has increased the importance for communication and coordination among state election directors", its website states. The association serves "as an exchange of best practices and ideas."

Role in the certification of e-voting machines

NASED has recently received attention for its role in the system for certifying e-voting machines. According to a September 2004 report by the Associated Press, "More than a decade ago, the Federal Election Commission authorized the National Association of State Election Directors to choose the independent testers." 

A company chosen by NASED to act as a tester is known as an Independent Testing Authority (ITA).

References

Further reading
Bill Poovey, "Secretive testing firms certify nation's vote count machines", Associated Press via San Francisco Chronicle, August 22, 2004.
Frequently Asked Questions About Voting System Standards, Federal Election Commission, May 18, 2001. Discusses relationship between the Election Center, NASED, and the ITAs. Apparently still current as at October 2004.
NASED Voting Systems Board membership list, Federal Election Commission, December 13, 2001. Apparently still current as at October 2004.
General Overview for Getting a Voting System Qualified (MS Word document), National Association of State Election Directors via the Election Center's website. (HTML version). Undated, accessed 25 October 2004.

External links
 

Professional associations based in the United States
Government-related professional associations
1989 establishments in the United States